Mysore V. Srikanth is a Carnatic music violinist. And the sibling of the famous Carnatic flautist  Raman kalyan. He has also accompanied him on various concerts.

Career
Mysore Srikanth,  a disciple of Vidwan H.K. Narasimha Murthy of Mysore, follows the 'Parur style' of fingering. He started learning Violin at a very young age and has undergone rigorous training for more than twenty years. 
Srikanth has been giving performances since he was fifteen years old. He has gained rich experience by accompanying top Artists like R.K.Srikantan, Dr.M.Balamuralikrishna, T.N.Seshagopalan, T.V.Sankaranarayanan, O.S.Thiagarajan, Trichur Ramachandran, Hyderabad Brothers, Yesudas, K.S.Gopalakrishnan, Rudrapatnam Brothers, Gayathri Venkataraghavan, Bombay Sisters, Sudha Raghunathan & others and received their blessings and appreciation. He has performed with great Mridangam stalwarts like Palghat Sri Raghu, T.K.Murthy, Guru Karaikkudi Mani, Guruvayur Dorai, Vellore Ramabhadran, Umayalpuram Sivaraman, Tiruvarur Bhaktavatsalam, SrimushnamRajarao and many others. Srikanth has been featured in several prestigious Music Sabhas & Organizations throughout the country.

Awards and titles
Srikanth, graded artist of AIR & Doordarshan, performs regularly for All India Radio, Doordarshan and other T.V. Channels. He has also performed for National Program of Music of Doordarshan. & All India Radio.  He has recorded many commercial CDs & cassettes with many great artists. 
He has won a number of prizes, accolades and appreciation from rasikas and critics. He is a recipient of Cultural Talent Search Scholarship of Government of India and has achieved Distinction in the Senior Grade Music Examination.

He was adjudged as the Best Violinist by:

 Krishna Gana Sabha - 1995
 The Indian Fine Arts Society (Sub- Senior category) -- Dec 2000 Music Season
 Karnataka Gana Kala Parishath – Young Musicians’ Conference – 2001
 The Music Academy (Madras) - Dec 2002 Music Season
 The Indian Fine Arts Society –Dec 2007 –Best Senior Violinist
 The Indian Fine Arts Society –Dec 2008 –Best Senior Violinist

Srikanth has been conferred with the title "Kala Praveen" in Feb 2002 at Bangalore. He has been honored with the prestigious Award for talented young Musicians----"Ananya Yuva Puraskar" for 2004 by the organization "Ananya" of Bangalore.
Srikanth is now regularly performing with many great artists & undergoing intensive training in the intricacies of Violin playing and looking forward for Great achievement in the field of Music.
Srikanth has traveled abroad widely to U. S. A., Australia, New Zealand, Dubai, Singapore, Qatar, U.K., Canada and many European countries with Rudrapatnam Brothers, T.N.Seshagopalan, Ranjani-Gayatri, Malladi Brothers, V.K.Raman, T.V.Ramprasadh, Bombay Jayashri, Abhishek Raghuram, Aruna Sairam, Shashank & others.

References

External links

Carnatic violinists
Living people
Musicians from Mysore
21st-century violinists
Year of birth missing (living people)